Chapel Hill High School is a public high school located in Tyler, Texas, United States and classified as a 4A school by the UIL. It is part of the Chapel Hill Independent School District located in southeastern Smith County.  In 2018, the school was rated "Met Standard" by the Texas Education Agency.

Athletics
The Chapel Hill Bulldogs compete in the following sports:

Cross Country
Volleyball
Football
Basketball
Powerlifting
Soccer
Golf
Tennis
Track
Softball
Baseball
Cheer
Drill Team

State Titles 
Football 
1989(4A), 2011(3A/D1)

Theater 
State Appearances
2000 (The Foreigner)
2011 (Too Much Memory)
2012 (Enron)

Clubs and activities 
Athletics Booster Club
BPA
Crime Stoppers
DCP
FCA
FCCLA
FFA
Graphic Arts Club
International Club
National Honor Society
National Technical Honors Society
Speech and Debate
Student Senate
TAFE
TSA
UIL Academics

References 

https://txschools.gov/schools/212909001/overview

External links 
 https://www.chapelhillisd.org/site/Default.aspx?DomainID=4

Educational institutions established in 1950
Schools in Smith County, Texas
Public high schools in Texas
1950 establishments in Texas